is a 2010 Japanese romance film directed by Hidetaka Itō who is known for the Fuji TV's variety show Run for Money Tōsōchū. Kazuma Sano and Mirei Kiritani play the lead roles. It was released on May 15, 2010.

Cast
 Kazuma Sano as Aoi Kagami
 Mirei Kiritani as Shion Mizuno
 Yasuhisa Furuhara as Keita Hara
 Rika Adachi as Karen Minami
 Keisuke Kato as Tsubasa Momose
 Naoko Tokuzawa

References

External links
  

2010 films
2010s Japanese films
2010s Japanese-language films
Japanese romance films
2010 romance films